Antha Rathirikku Satchi Illai is a 1982 Indian Tamil-language film directed by R. Sundarrajan. The film stars newcomer Kapil Dev, Sulakshana and Sivachandran. It was released on 15 October 1982.

Plot

Cast 
Kapil Dev
Sulakshana
Sivachandran
Vanitha
Usha
S. S. Chandran
Senthil

Soundtrack 
The soundtrack was composed by K. V. Mahadevan.

Release and reception 
Antha Rathirikku Satchi Illai was released on 15 October 1982. Kalki said .

References

External links 
 

1980s Tamil-language films
1982 films
Films directed by R. Sundarrajan
Films scored by K. V. Mahadevan